The Varanger Sami Museum (VSM) is a museum for Sami culture and history in Varangerbotn in Nesseby in Troms og Finnmark.

The museum is working with the Sea Sami history along Varangerfjord, Sami prehistory and contemporary Sami culture. The museum was established in 1983, and has since 2012 been a part of the joint museum .

The main building was erected in 1994, inspired by traditional Sami architecture. The main building contains a basis exhibition, the children's room  (the Stallo's den) and temporary exhibitions. VSM is also maintaining the cultural landscape and the excavations at Mortensnes.

References

External links
 Museum website
 saivu.com; web exhibit on Sami mythology

Museums in Troms og Finnmark
History museums in Norway
Sámi culture
Sámi history
Nesseby